Odo (c. 857 – 1 January 898) was the elected King of West Francia from 888 to 898. He was the first king from the Robertian dynasty. Before assuming the kingship, Odo was the count of Paris. His reign marked the definitive separation of West Francia from the Carolingian Empire, which would never reunite.

Family and inheritance

Odo was the eldest son of Robert the Strong, who was Duke of the Franks, Margrave of Neustria, and Count of Anjou. After his father's death at the Battle of Brissarthe in 866, Odo inherited the Margraviate of Neustria. Odo lost this title in 868 when King Charles the Bald appointed Hugh the Abbot to the title. Odo regained it following the death of Hugh in 886. After 882 he was the count of Paris. Odo was also the lay abbot of St. Martin of Tours.

In 882 or 883 Odo married Théodrate of Troyes. The eleventh-century chronicler Adémar de Chabannes wrote that they had a son, Arnoul (c.882–898), who died shortly after his father. Guy is named as one of the couple's children in an Alan I's charter dated 28 August 903, but genealogist Christian Settipani has argued that the document is false.
The genealogical work Europäische Stammtafeln refers to Raoul as a son of Odo by Théodrate, but its primary source is not known.

Reign

For his skill and bravery in resisting the attacks of Vikings during the 885–886 Siege of Paris, Odo was chosen by the western Frankish nobles to be their king following the overthrow of Emperor Charles the Fat. He was crowned at Compiègne in February 888 by Walter, Archbishop of Sens.

Odo continued to battle against the Vikings and defeated them at Montfaucon, but was soon involved in a struggle with powerful Frankish nobles who supported the claim of Charles the Simple to the throne.

In 890 Odo granted special privileges to the County of Manresa in Osona. Because of its position on the front line against the Moorish aggression, Manresa was given the right to build towers of defence known as manresanas or manresanes. This privilege was responsible for giving Manresa its unique character, distinct from the rest of Osona, for the next two centuries.

To gain prestige and support, Odo paid homage to the East Francia's King Arnulf in 888. Despite this, in 894 Arnulf declared his support for Charles the Simple, and after a conflict which lasted three years, Odo was compelled to come to terms with his rival and surrender a district north of the Seine to him. Odo died in La Fère on 1 January 898.

In popular culture
A character named Count Odo is portrayed by Owen Roe in the History Channel's 2013 hit TV series Vikings. This fictional Odo actually saves Paris from a Viking attack, but is killed before ever succeeding in becoming king.

Count Odo appears in The Siege of Paris, the second expansion to the 2020 video game Assassin's Creed Valhalla.

Odo appears in the game Crusader Kings III as a bookmarked character. Players can play as him from the year 867, when he is ten years old, and may gain an achievement for leading his dynasty to rule the Kingdom of France.

References

Bibliography

External links 
 

|-

9th-century kings of West Francia
850s births
898 deaths
Burials at the Basilica of Saint-Denis
Counts of Orléans
Counts of Paris
Frankish warriors
Robertians